Pangasella is a genus of tephritid  or fruit flies in the family Tephritidae.

Species
Pangasella volkovitshi Richter, 1995

References

Tephritinae
Tephritidae genera
Diptera of Asia